Josef Kuchař (2 April 1901 – 13 March 1986) was a Czech footballer. He played in one match for the Czechoslovakia national football team in 1924.

References

External links
 

1901 births
1986 deaths
Czech footballers
Czechoslovakia international footballers
Footballers from Prague
People from the Kingdom of Bohemia
Association football midfielders
SK Slavia Prague players
Footballers at the 1920 Summer Olympics
Olympic footballers of Czechoslovakia